Nancy Uqquujuq Karetak-Lindell  (born December 10, 1957) is a former Canadian politician. Previously she was a financial comptroller and held councillor positions for the Municipal Hamlet and District Education Authority in Arviat, Nunavut. Karetak-Lindell ran for a seat in the House of Commons of Canada as a Liberal candidate in the 1997 federal election in the riding of Nunavut, becoming the first female MP for the Eastern Arctic. She was re-elected easily in the 2000, 2004 and 2006 elections.

She was the parliamentary secretary to the Minister of Natural Resources in 2003. She also served as the chair and vice-chair of the Standing Committee on Aboriginal Affairs and Northern Development, a member of the Liaison Committee, Fisheries and Oceans Standing Committee, an associate member of both the Standing Committee on Canadian Heritage and the Standing Committee on Human Resources, Social Development and the Status of Persons with Disabilities.
 
Karetak-Lindell retained her seat in the 2006 federal election, but later announced she would not seek re-election in the 2008 election. Her decision to step down was to spend more time with her family and to take care of her elderly parents.

She was born in Eskimo Point, Northwest Territories, now Arviat, Nunavut, and is Inuit. She is a mother of four sons. She was director of the Jane Glassco Arctic Fellowship Program from 2009 until 2012. Karetak-Lindell  served as president of the Inuit Circumpolar Council Canada and has been Chief Returning Officer for multiple Inuit organization elections and has worked for Elections Nunavut.

Karetak-Lindell has been on the board of directors of the Nunavut Development Corporation, the Nunavut Business Credit Corporation, the Kivalliq Inuit Association, Katimavik, Northwest Territories Power Corporation,  Northwestel, and Thebacha College that transitioned into Arctic College and then, after division of the territories, Nunavut Arctic College. She is currently on the board for Nunavut Trust, Polar Knowledge Canada and a member of the Task Force on Women in the Economy.

In 2022, she was named as a Member of the Order of Canada.

Electoral record

References

External links
 

1957 births
Canadian people of Icelandic descent
Women members of the House of Commons of Canada
Members of the House of Commons of Canada from the Northwest Territories
Members of the House of Commons of Canada from Nunavut
Liberal Party of Canada MPs
Living people
Inuit politicians
Women in Nunavut politics
Women in Northwest Territories politics
People from Arviat
Indigenous Members of the House of Commons of Canada
Canadian Inuit women
21st-century Canadian politicians
21st-century Canadian women politicians
Inuit from the Northwest Territories
Inuit from Nunavut
Members of the Order of Canada